Ajit Kumar Maiti (born 1928) is an Indian neurophysiologist associated with the University of Maryland. He is known for his pioneering researches on spinal cord physiology and his studies are reported to have widened the understanding of the role of spinal cord in regulating blood pressure and carbohydrate metabolism in human body. The Council of Scientific and Industrial Research, the apex agency of the Government of India for scientific research, awarded him the Shanti Swarup Bhatnagar Prize for Science and Technology, one of the highest Indian science awards for his contributions to Medical Sciences in 1971.

References 

Recipients of the Shanti Swarup Bhatnagar Award in Medical Science
1928 births
Indian medical academics
Indian physiologists
Indian neuroscientists
Living people
Medical doctors from West Bengal